Kanish Sharma (born 4 July 1992) is an Indian film score composer, music director, singer, and lyricist. He debuted as a film composer in the 2014 Hindi film Babloo Happy Hai directed by Nila Madhab Panda.

Discography

As Music Director

Background score
 Babloo Happy Hai (2014)
 Ek Extra Mile (Webseries) (2022)

References

External links

1992 births
Living people
Indian film score composers
Indian lyricists
Indian male singers
Music directors